Malinyi District is a district of the Morogoro Region of Tanzania.

In 2016 the Tanzania National Bureau of Statistics report there were 125,472 people in the ward.

People in the region 
Around 60% of the people in this regio is illiterate.

Sights 
Kilombero Game Reserve: The District shares part of the Kilombero River Game Reserve. The reserve is home to large numbers of buffalo, elephant, zebra, crocodile and the colobus Monkeys.

NGOs in Malinyi 
 SolidarMed Solidar Suisse 
 Eye Care Foundation

References 

Districts of Morogoro Region